Chapacris is a monotypic genus of grasshoppers containing only the species Chapacris tonkinensis. It is in the family Acrididae and subfamily Catantopinae. This species can be found in Vietnam.

References 

Acrididae genera
Orthoptera of Indo-China
Monotypic Orthoptera genera
Insects described in 1940